Jackass Forever (stylized as jackass fore♥er) is a 2022 American stunt comedy film directed and produced by Jeff Tremaine, along with producers Spike Jonze and Johnny Knoxville, and was released by Paramount Pictures. It is the fourth main installment in the Jackass film series, following Jackass 3D (2010). The film stars original Jackass members Knoxville, Steve-O, Dave England, Wee Man, Danger Ehren, Chris Pontius, Preston Lacy, newcomers to the Jackass crew, and celebrity guests. This is the first Jackass film not to feature Ryan Dunn since his death in 2011 and the first without Bam Margera being a primary cast member as he was fired during production, appearing briefly in one skit.
 
Jackass Forever premiered at the Chinese Theatre in Hollywood, California on February 1, 2022, and was theatrically released on February 4. The film was well received by critics, with many considering it the best film of the franchise. It was also a commercial success, grossing over $80 million worldwide against a budget of $10 million.

Unused footage from the film was compiled separately, titled Jackass 4.5, and released on Netflix on May 20, 2022.

Synopsis

Jackass Forever is a compilation of stunts, skits and pranks intercut with on-set talking heads with its cast. The film begins with a tribute to kaiju cinema, in what appears to be a city being overrun by a giant green monster. In reality, it is Chris Pontius' penis painted green over a small set of a city intercut with the cast members running through a life-size set of the same city. The intro ends with the "monster" bitten by a snapping turtle and Johnny Knoxville's intro, "Hello, I'm Johnny Knoxville! Welcome to Jackass!"

Stunts and pranks with the main cast include Knoxville facing a bull resulting in dangerous consequences, Steve-O having his penis used as a beehive, Dave England getting pig semen dumped on him, a vulture eating pieces of meat off Wee Man's body, Ehren McGhehey being subjected to painful tests with an athletic cup, Pontius' penis being used as the paddle for paddle ball, and Preston Lacy's testicles being used as a human punching bag. The newcomers are also featured in many of the stunts and pranks, including Poopies fighting off a Texas Ratsnake, Zach Holmes gliding down into a bed of cactuses, Jasper Dolphin being shot off a ramp by large industrial fans while he's holding a parachute, Eric Manaka riding a bicycle full speed into a false wall, and Rachel Wolfson having a scorpion sting her lips.

The final stunt, Vomitron, features Zach, Dave, Eric, Poopies, Steve-O and Jasper drinking milk while strapped to a high-speed carousel. As they start vomiting, Knoxville and the rest of the cast initiate an attack involving paintball guns, a tennis machine and multiple explosions. After assuring the stunt is over, one big explosion is set off, surprising the victims of the stunt.

Cast
The cast from the previous films return, with the exception of original Jackass member Ryan Dunn, who died in 2011, but does appear through archival footage in the end credits and the movie is seen as a tribute to him.

It is the first Jackass film to feature new cast members. Bam Margera was terminated from production in August 2020, for breaking his contract due to mandates related to substance abuse. However, he appears briefly in "The Marching Band", filmed prior to his firing, as well as being seen in archival footage. Margera also filmed the segment "Silence of the Lambs" with Steve-O, but his scenes weren't included in the final cut. He was also in the background of "The Triple Wedgie", but was removed for the most part.

Guest appearances  

Cameos in the intro sequence include Arthur H. Spiegel III, Errol Chatham, Alia Shawkat, Jalen Ramsey, Otmara Marrero, DJ Paul, Sean Malto, Mike Carroll, Breana Geering, Rick Howard, Compston "Dark Shark" Wilson, Tyler, the Creator, Lionel Boyce, Travis "Taco" Bennett, Louie Anderson, Syd tha Kyd, Vincent Alvarez, and Tony Hawk.

Crew 
A significant portion of the film's crew appears onscreen:
 Director and producer Jeff Tremaine
 Producer Spike Jonze
 Executive producers Shanna Zablow Newton, and Greg "Guch" Iguchi (who is also a cameraman for this movie)
 Consulting producer Trip Taylor
 Co-producer and cinematographer Dimitry Elyashkevich
 Co-producer and photographer Sean Cliver
 Camera operators Lance Bangs, and Rick Kosick (who also serves as an associate producer)
 Chris Raab (also known as Raab Himself), who was a recurring cast member in the Jackass TV show and in Jackass: The Movie, now serves as a camera operator
 MTV producer Brent Stoller
 First assistant director Joe Osborne
 Boom operator Seamus Frawley
 Assistant property master Mike Kassak
 Stunt coordinator Charles Grisham

Production

Development 
In 2018, Johnny Knoxville said that he was open to making a fourth Jackass film that may feature some new cast members, "just to bring in some fresh blood into it". He said that he had continued to write ideas for stunts and that "a ton" have been set aside for the project, should it receive the green-light. In July 2019, former cast member Chris Raab said that he had interviewed the Jackass crew on his Bathroom Break podcast and noted that everyone was still open to a fourth film should Knoxville, Jeff Tremaine, and Spike Jonze agree. In late 2019, Knoxville met with Tremaine and released a 200-page document of concepts for a fourth Jackass film. They agreed to film for two days with the entire cast to determine "if it still feels right" to make Jackass 4. "Honestly, after just five minutes of filming, we were ready to commit to making a movie", Tremaine said. In September 2020, Steve-O had said he was surprised the film "even came to fruition".

In May 2021, Knoxville stated the film would be his final contribution to the Jackass franchise. "You can only take so many chances before something irreversible happens," Knoxville said. "I feel like I've been extremely lucky to take the chances I've taken and still be walking around." During his July 12, 2021 appearance on Jimmy Kimmel Live!, Knoxville revealed the film's title and showed the first official photos.

Bam Margera's firing 
In January 2021, Bam Margera indicated that Paramount Pictures regards him as a liability, owing to his behavior over the last few years. He indicated that Tremaine had fought with the studio to keep Margera in the film, but Margera was uncertain that Paramount was going to allow him to partake in filming. On February 11, Margera posted several videos to his Instagram account, in which he admitted to breaking his sobriety and claimed that he had been officially fired from the filming of Jackass 4. Throughout the video, Margera could be seen crying, vomiting, and alluding to having looked up "how to tie a noose" before his move to Oceanside, California. Margera alleged that Paramount had been forcing him to take antidepressants, submit to random urine tests, and to check in to two rehabilitation facilities using his own money. He also expressed disdain for Tremaine, Knoxville, and Jonze before asking his fans to boycott the film. He then solicited his followers to send him money in order to film his own movie to compete with Jackass Forever. The videos were removed from Margera's Instagram account soon after being posted. On May 25, 2021, Tremaine filed a temporary restraining order against Margera due to Margera's harassment of Tremaine and Knoxville via Instagram. Tremaine was granted an additional three-year restraining order, extended to Tremaine's wife and children, after Margera allegedly sent his family death threats. On August 9, 2021, Margera officially filed a lawsuit against Knoxville, Jonze, and Tremaine, as well as against Paramount Pictures, MTV, Dickhouse Entertainment, and Gorilla Flicks, alleging that he was wrongfully fired from the film's production. Margera also said that the film makes use of contributions he made before his firing and is seeking an injunction on the October release of the film as a result. On January 12, 2022, Knoxville said that one scene Margera filmed will remain, despite the lawsuit. Both parties came to terms on a settlement after Margera asked to dismiss the lawsuit on April 14, 2022. The details of the settlement remain private. Margera was still able to fully be in Jackass Forever by attending a Zoom meeting with Knoxville, Spike, and Tremaine. However, Margera did not attend this meeting.

Casting
On May 25, Knoxville confirmed six new cast members: Jasper Dolphin of Odd Future, and one of the stars of Loiter Squad; Jasper's ex-convict father Compston "Dark Shark" Wilson; Eric Manaka, who had a role in Knoxville's film Action Point; stand-up comedian Rachel Wolfson; Zach Holmes from Too Stupid to Die; and surfer Sean "Poopies" McInerney who had previously appeared in the Jackass Shark Week special. The project was initially presented as a possible anniversary special, and the new cast were later told it would be a movie.

Filming 
Wee Man stated that they originally planned to film in different locations around the world, which was ultimately thwarted by the COVID-19 pandemic. He also claimed that Paramount Pictures used Jackass Forever to see how film studios could potentially resume filming during the pandemic. Because the majority of the film was filmed during the COVID-19 pandemic, all cast and crew members had to be tested for COVID-19 every day of filming. On January 6, 2022, Jeff Tremaine stated that all of the testing combined had a cost of "about over (sic) one million dollars".

Test filming began on December 10, 2019. During the two days of test filming, professional skateboarder Aaron "Jaws" Homoki broke his hand, and got a concussion. Principal photography started on March 3, 2020. On the first day of filming, the cast threw snakes on Bam Margera in the dark in order to induce his fear of snakes. Two days after receiving the green-light, Steve-O and Johnny Knoxville were hospitalized. Filming had shut down in March 2020, due to the COVID-19 pandemic, and resumed seven months later on October 19, 2020, with Dimitry Elyashkevich serving as cinematographer.

Injuries 
Wee Man said that out of all Jackass films, "this one hurt the most". On December 15, 2020, it was reported that Knoxville and Steve-O had been hospitalized due to on-set injuries. Knoxville was injured while filming a rodeo stunt at the ranch of Gary Leffew. After being charged by a bull, he suffered a broken rib, a broken wrist, a concussion and a hemorrhage on his brain. Steve-O broke his collarbone but the stunt was cut. Steve-O also lost both of his eyebrows in another scene that was cut from the film, but was shown in Jackass 4.5. Ehren McGhehey ruptured his right testicle after one of the "Cup Tests". Pro skateboarder Aaron "Jaws" Homoki severely burnt his right hand in another cut scene. Dave England also burnt his right hand during the opening sequence. Zach Holmes got an infection after he glided into the cactus patch.

Release
On December 19, 2019, Paramount Pictures scheduled the film for release on March 5, 2021. In April 2020, the release date was delayed to July 2, 2021. In July 2020, the film was delayed again to September 3, 2021 due to the COVID-19 pandemic. In April 2021, the film was delayed yet again to October 22, 2021. In September 2021, the film was delayed once more to February 4, 2022. The film had its world premiere at the Chinese Theatre in Hollywood, California, on February 1, 2022, and was released theatrically by Paramount Pictures on February 4, 2022.

Home media 
The film became available on Paramount+ on March 22, 2022, and digitally on March 29, 2022, followed by a Blu-ray and DVD release on April 19, 2022. The Blu-ray, DVD and digital releases include 40 minutes of additional footage. It was broadcast on Showtime on August 21, 2022.

Reception

Box office 
Jackass Forever grossed $57.8million in the United States and Canada, and $22.7million in other territories, for a worldwide total of $80.5million.

In the United States and Canada, Jackass Forever was released alongside Moonfall, and was projected to gross around $15 million from 3,604 theaters in its opening weekend, with Boxoffice Pro predicting a $22–32 million three-day debut. The film earned $9.6 million on its first day (including an estimated $1.65 million from Thursday night previews), increasing weekend predictions to $20 million. Around 300 theaters were closed on Thursday due to a winter storm impacting most of the Midwestern United States. Jackass Forever went on to debut with $23.2 million. It is the third film from Paramount to finish first at the box office in its opening weekend during the COVID-19 pandemic, following A Quiet Place Part II and Scream. Social media monitor RelishMix credited the film's box office performance to a large online fanbase, positive word of mouth, and shoutouts to Margera, Knoxville's physical journey, and "memories of Jackass over 22 years". Box office analytics firm EntTelligence also noted the film's runtime of 96 minutes for increasing the number of showtimes in theaters. Deadline Hollywood mentioned the film's genre and the franchise's prevalence on TikTok as other contributing factors. The film made $8.1 million in its second weekend, $5.2 million in its third, $3.1 million in its fourth, $1.4 million in its fifth, and $1.1 million in its sixth. The film dropped out of the box office top ten in its seventh weekend, finishing twelfth with $510,117.

Outside the U.S. and Canada, the film grossed $5.2 million from nine markets, including $2.8 million in the U.K. and $1.8 million from Australia, the latter opening in first place at the box office while the film finished second in the U.K., Norway, and New Zealand. The film earned $2.7 million in its second weekend, $2 million in its third, $1.7 million in its fourth, $767,000 in its fifth, $1.8 million in its sixth, $1.1 million in its seventh, and $585,000 in its eighth.

Critical response 
  It is the highest rated Jackass film on both websites. Audiences polled by CinemaScore gave the film an average grade of "B+" on an A+ to F scale, while those at PostTrak gave it an 86% positive score, with 67% saying they would definitely recommend it.

Owen Gleiberman of Variety wrote: "the team have not slacked off in their mission to create what are basically the world's most stupidly elaborate frat-house hazing stunts, and to stage them with a juvenile masochistic fervor that lies somewhere between psychotic and religious." David Fear of Rolling Stone gave it 4 out of 5 and wrote: "Forget the title: Jackass can't go on forever. Just enjoy one last chance to see these beautiful fuck-ups do what they do best before they limp and hobble off into the sunset."

Jackass 4.5
In a 2021 interview on The Film Stage, director and producer Jeff Tremaine was asked if Eric André would make an appearance in Jackass Forever after collaborating on Bad Trip: "Maybe Eric's in it. If he's not, he'll be in Jackass 4.5," Tremaine said. Cast member Ehren McGhehey said they had filmed so much for Jackass Forever and ended up with two films worth of footage. He also said that Jackass 4.5 would be similar to Jackass 2.5 and Jackass 3.5, consisting of behind-the-scenes, unused footage, outtakes, and interviews with the cast and crew members. Chris Pontius stated that Jackass 4.5 would be released on Netflix, which Johnny Knoxville later confirmed. Preston Lacy and Steve-O said that it will be available on Netflix until 2024, and will move exclusively to Paramount+ afterwards. It was released on May 20, 2022.

References

External links
 
 
 

2022 black comedy films
American black comedy films
Dickhouse Productions films
2020s English-language films
Films based on television series
Films directed by Jeff Tremaine
Films postponed due to the COVID-19 pandemic
Films with screenplays by Johnny Knoxville
Films with screenplays by Spike Jonze
Jackass (film series)
Jackass (TV series)
MTV Films films
Paramount Pictures films
2020s American films